Michael McIntyre's Comedy Roadshow is a British stand-up comedy television series hosted by comedian Michael McIntyre from different venues around the United Kingdom and Ireland. The first series was broadcast with six episodes in 2009. Each episode features a routine from McIntyre, followed by three other comedians before the headline act. A second six-episode series in the same format followed in 2010.

A special one-hour Christmas episode transmitted on 25 December 2011.

Production
The series was commissioned in February 2009 following the success of Live at the Apollo. Hosted by stand-up comedian Michael McIntyre, the series aimed to bring acts "new to a BBC One Saturday night audience". The series is often repeated on Comedy Central and is broadcast in high definition on BBC HD and Comedy Central HD.

Episodes

Series 1 (2009)
{| class="wikitable" style="text-align:center; width:70%;"
|-
! Episode
! Location
! Headliner
! Comedians
! Airdate
|-
| 1x01
| Edinburgh Playhouse
| Rhod Gilbert
| Kevin BridgesStewart FrancisMark Watson
| 6 June 2009
|-
| 1x02
| Manchester Apollo
| Jason Manford
| John BishopMick FerrySarah Millican
| 13 June 2009
|-
| 1x03
| Birmingham Hippodrome
| Shappi Khorsandi
| Steve HughesTom StadePaul Tonkinson
| 20 June 2009
|-
| 1x04
| Swansea Grand Theatre
| Sean Lock
| Alun CochraneAva VidalSteve Williams
| 27 June 2009
|-
| 1x05
| Belfast Waterfront Hall
| Patrick Kielty 
| Neil DelamereKerry GodlimanJeff Green
| 4 July 2009
|-
| 1x06
| Brighton Dome
| Al Murray(as The Pub Landlord)
| Jo CaulfieldMicky FlanaganJon Richardson
| 11 July 2009
|}

Series 2 (2010)
{| class="wikitable" style="text-align:center; width:70%;"
|-
! Episode
! Location
! Headliner
! Comedians
! Airdate
|-
| 2x01
| Glasgow Theatre Royal
| Kevin Bridges
| Craig CampbellMilton JonesDaniel Sloss
| 18 September 2010
|-
| 2x02
| Sunderland Empire
| Sarah Millican
| Simon EvansImran YusufJimeoin
| 25 September 2010
|-
| 2x03
| Blackpool Grand Theatre
| John Bishop
| Terry AldertonMiles JuppJustin Moorhouse
| 2 October 2010
|-
| 2x04
| Olympia Theatre Dublin
| Tommy Tiernan
| Keith FarnanAndrew LawrenceZoe Lyons
| 9 October 2010
|-
| 2x05
| Bristol Hippodrome
| Noel Fielding
| Hal CruttendenMike GunnSeann Walsh
| 16 October 2010
|-
| 2x06
| Leeds Grand
| Ardal O'Hanlon
| Sean CollinsAndi OshoJack Whitehall
| 23 October 2010
|}

Christmas special (2011)
Michael McIntyre's Comedy Roadshow returned for an hour long Christmas special on 25 December 2011 at 10.30pm.
{| class="wikitable" style="text-align:center; width:70%;"
|-
! Episode
! Location
! Comedians
! Musical acts
! Airdate
|-
| Special 
| Theatre Royal, Drury Lane
| Rob BrydonJames Corden and Miranda HartJack DeeRhod GilbertSean LockDavid Mitchell
| Pixie LottKylie Minogue
| 25 December 2011
|}

Broadcast
In Australia, season one and two aired back-to-back on ABC1 each Saturday at 9:20pm (moved to 9:35pm for season two) from 18 September 2010. Episodes also made available from the ABC iview catch-up service.

Reception
The series peaked with 5.5 million viewers for the first episode, which also gained 1.17 million views on BBC iPlayer, the third highest for the year to 13 December 2009 behind Top Gear. In The Times, David Chater said that "If this roadshow is anything to go by, the quality of stand-up in Britain is at an all-time high." The series was nominated in the Best Comedy Entertainment Programme category for the 2009 British Comedy Awards.

In 2011 the programme was nominated in the National Television Awards but lost out to ITV Comedy, Benidorm. It's also nominated for the Entertainment Award in 2012 as well as Michael being nominated as best Entertainment Performance. The programme won the Entertainment Award, but Michael lost out as presenter to Ant and Dec.

DVD
'Michael Mcintyre's Comedy Roadshow' has not been commercially released onto DVD on its own, however both series have been available to watch on demand on services such as Lovefilm and Netflix. Michael's Stand up Segments from Series 1 were collected into a compilation and were included on his 'Hello Wembley DVD' as a special feature. Michael's segments from Series 2 were also placed into a compilation which was included on its own DVD as a content exclusive to the 'Michael Mcintyre Stand Up Collection Boxset' which was released in 2010.

Notes

References

External links

2009 British television series debuts
2011 British television series endings
2000s British comedy television series
2010s British comedy television series
BBC television comedy
British stand-up comedy television series
English-language television shows